Joshua Akinkunmi Debayo (born 17 October 1996) is a Nigerian professional footballer who last played as a defender for Queen of the South in the Scottish Championship. He became a free agent on 30 June 2022.

Career
After playing youth football for Fulham, Chelsea, Southampton and Leicester City, Debayo signed with Cheltenham Town in July 2018.

On 11 October 2018, Debayo signed for Dover Athletic on loan until January 2019. Debayo debuted for the club two days later in a 2–2 away draw versus Harrogate Town. On 4 January 2019, Debayo signed a loan extension until the end of the 2018–19 season.

Debayo was offered a new contract by the Robins at the end of the 2019–20 season, although he rejected the offer and departed the club. Debayo then signed for Wealdstone on 19 December 2020. On 4 February 2021, Debayo departed the Royals after making just one league appearance for the club.

On 27 July 2021, Debayo signed a one-year contract with Scottish Championship club Queen of the South. Following relegation to Scottish League One, Debayo was released by the club at the end of the 2021–22 season.

Career statistics

References

1996 births
Living people
Nigerian footballers
Fulham F.C. players
Chelsea F.C. players
Southampton F.C. players
Leicester City F.C. players
Cheltenham Town F.C. players
Dover Athletic F.C. players
Wealdstone F.C. players
Queen of the South F.C. players 
English Football League players
National League (English football) players
Association football defenders
Nigerian expatriate footballers
Nigerian expatriate sportspeople in England
Expatriate footballers in England
Scottish Professional Football League players